Sparta is a city in and the county seat of Hancock County, Georgia, United States. It is part of the Milledgeville Micropolitan Statistical Area.  The city's population was 1,400 at the 2010 census.

History
Sparta was founded in 1795 in the newly formed Hancock County. The town was designated county seat in 1797. It was incorporated as a town in 1805 and as a city in 1893. The community was named after Sparta, a city-state in Ancient Greece.

Geography
Sparta is located at  (33.2773, -82.9715).

Major Highways
  State Route 15
  State Route 16
  State Route 22

Demographics

2020 census

As of the 2020 United States census, there were 1,357 people, 669 households, and 419 families residing in the city.

2010 census
According to the 2010 census estimate, there were 1,522 people, 617 households and 385 families residing in the city. The racial makeup of the city was 4.5% White, 95.70% African American, 0.13% Native American, 0.33% Asian, and 0.46% from two or more races. Hispanic or Latino of any race were 0.70% of the population.

There were 617 households, of which 26.9% had children under the age of 18 living with them, 25.4% were married couples living together, 31.8% had a female householder with no husband present, and 37.6% were non-families. 35.0% of all households were made up of individuals, and 17.7% had someone living alone who was 65 years of age or older. The average household size was 2.44 and the average family size was 3.20.

Age distribution was 27.4% under the age of 18, 9.1% from 18 to 24, 23.1% from 25 to 44, 24.6% from 45 to 64, and 15.8% who were 65 years of age or older. The median age was 37 years. For every 100 females, there were 83.4 males. For every 100 females age 18 and over, there were 74.3 males.

The median household income was $21,664, and the median family income was $24,044. Males had a median income of $21,375 versus $17,375 for females. The per capita income for the city was $11,403. About 31.8% of families and 34.8% of the population were below the poverty line, including 46.2% of those under age 18 and 38.4% of those age 65 or over.

Economy
Sparta is the site of Georgia's Hancock State Prison.

Education

Hancock County School District 

The Hancock County School District holds pre-school to grade twelve, and consists of one elementary school, a middle school, and a high school. The district has 103 full-time teachers and over 1,659 students.

Lewis Elementary School
Hancock Central Middle School
Hancock Central High School
 John Hancock Academy

Notable people
Thomas "Pee Wee" Butts – professional baseball player
George Darden – United States Representative from Georgia who went to high school in Sparta
Harvey Grant – professional basketball player
Horace Grant – professional basketball player
Tommy Hurricane Jackson – professional boxer
Adella Hunt Logan – suffragist
Jean Toomer – Harlem Renaissance writer and poet, once served as a principal in Sparta

See also

Central Savannah River Area
 Rossiter-Little House - Oldest house in Sparta

References

Further reading
 "History of Sparta, Georgia", Georgia Encyclopedia (John Rozier, Emory University), 12/5/2008
 Kent Anderson Leslie, Woman of Color, Daughter of Privilege: Amanda America Dickson, 1849-1893 (Athens: University of Georgia Press, 1995).
 John Rozier, Black Boss: Political Revolution in a Georgia County (Athens: University of Georgia Press, 1982).
 John Rozier, The Houses of Hancock, 1785-1865 (Decatur, Ga.: privately printed, 1996).
 John Rozier, ed., The Granite Farm Letters: The Civil War Correspondence of Edgeworth and Sallie Bird  (Athens: University of Georgia Press, 1988).
 Forrest Shivers, The Land Between: A History of Hancock County, Georgia, to 1940 (Spartanburg, S.C.: Reprint Co., 1990).

External links
 Sparta historical marker
 Sparta Cemetery historical marker
 Pierce Memorial Methodist Church historical marker

Cities in Georgia (U.S. state)
Cities in Hancock County, Georgia
County seats in Georgia (U.S. state)
Milledgeville micropolitan area, Georgia